Sice may refer to:

People
Sice, former vocalist of The Boo Radleys
Gary Sice (born 1984), Gaelic footballer
James C. Van Sice, Rear Admiral Upper Half of the United States Coast Guard
Robert van Sice, American percussionist

Other uses
Sarajevo International Culture Exchange, an international art project
Southern Idaho College of Education in Albion, Idaho; closed in 1951